Snellman may refer to:

Snellman (surname)
Snellman, Minnesota, unincorporated community in Becker County, Minnesota, United States

See also
Snelland
Snellen (disambiguation)